Jacob Seth Lofland (born July 30, 1996) is an American actor best known for his role as Neckbone in the film Mud and for his role as Aris in Maze Runner: The Scorch Trials and Maze Runner: The Death Cure.

Life and career
Lofland was born in Briggsville, Arkansas, the son of Billy and Debra Lofland.

He began his film career playing Neckbone in Jeff Nichols' Mud, with Matthew McConaughey and Tye Sheridan. The director wanted to find a young actor locally for the part, and had casting notices placed in regional newspapers. Coming across one of them, Lofland's mother recognized that her son fit every adjective of Neck's personality description, as well as bringing the boating and cycle riding experience for which Nichols was looking. Lofland sent in an application, and was called in to read for the casting director in Little Rock. Less than three weeks after his mother saw the open casting call in the paper, Lofland took his first plane flight to Austin to audition for Nichols and producer Sarah Green. He was offered the role and within a month found himself on location with a full movie crew.

In 2013, he joined the cast of Little Accidents, presented at the 2014 Sundance Film Festival.

In 2014, he joined the cast of the new season of Justified, and in 2015, he co-starred as Aris in the film Maze Runner: The Scorch Trials. In 2018, Lofland reprised the role in Maze Runner: The Death Cure.

Filmography

Film

Television

Awards and nominations

References

External links
 
  

1996 births
American male child actors
Living people
People from Yell County, Arkansas